Pristimantis delius is a species of frog in the family Strabomantidae. It is found in the Amazon basin of Ecuador, northern Peru, and western Brazil (Acre state).
Its natural habitat is tropical moist lowland forest.

References

delius
Amphibians of Brazil
Amphibians of Ecuador
Amphibians of Peru
Amphibians described in 1995
Taxonomy articles created by Polbot